Zhonghe Senior High School is an under construction metro station on the Wanda–Zhonghe–Shulin line located in Zhonghe, New Taipei, Taiwan. The station is scheduled to open at the end of 2025.

Station overview 
The station will be a two-level, underground station with an island platform. The station will possess abundant natural resources and reflect the idea of a living museum throughout the entire line, which is based on the natural mountain forestry concepts of the "Rhythm of Ecology."

Station layout

Around the station 
New Taipei Municipal Zhonghe Senior High School

References 

Wanda–Zhonghe–Shulin line stations
Railway stations scheduled to open in 2025